The 2010 Evening Standard Theatre Awards were announced on 29 November 2010. The shortlist was revealed on 22 November 2010 and the longlist on 25 October 2010.

Winners, shortlist and longlist

 = winner

Best Play
  Clybourne Park by Bruce Norris (Royal Court)
 Cock by Mike Bartlett (Royal Court)
 Sucker Punch by Roy Williams (Royal Court)

Longlisted
 The Big Fellah by Richard Bean (Lyric Hammersmith)
 The Habit of Art by Alan Bennett (National's Lyttelton)
 Beautiful Burnout by Bryony Lavery (York Hall)
 Ruined by Lynn Nottage (Almeida)
 Posh by Laura Wade (Royal Court)

Best Director
  Howard Davies for The White Guard (National's Lyttelton) & All My Sons (Apollo)
 Nicholas Hytner for The Habit of Art (National's Lyttelton) & London Assurance (National's Olivier) & Hamlet (National's Olivier)
 Laurie Sansom for Beyond the Horizon and Spring Storm (National's Cottesloe)
 Thea Sharrock for After the Dance (National's Lyttelton)

Longlisted
 Dominic Cooke for Clybourne Park (Royal Court)
 Rupert Goold for Romeo and Juliet (RSC Stratford) & Earthquakes in London (National's Cottesloe)
 Michael Grandage for Red (Donmar Warehouse) & Danton's Death (National's Olivier)
 Jeremy Herrin for Spur of the Moment (Royal Court)
 Joe Hill-Gibbins for The Beauty Queen of Leenane (Young Vic)
 James MacDonald for Cock (Royal Court)
 Roger Michell for Rope (Almeida)
  Lyndsey Turner for Posh (Royal Court)

Best Actor
  Rory Kinnear, Measure for Measure (Almeida) & Hamlet (National's Olivier)
 Roger Allam, Henry IV Parts One and Two (Shakespeare's Globe)
 David Suchet, All My Sons (Apollo)

Longlisted
 Bertie Carvel, Rope (Almeida)
 Benedict Cumberbatch, After the Dance (National's Lyttelton)
 Martin Freeman, Clybourne Park (Royal Court)
 Alex Jennings, The Habit of Art (National's Lyttelton)
 Adrian Lester, Cat on a Hot Tin Roof (Novello)
 Alfred Molina, Red (Donmar Warehouse)
 Jonathan Pryce, The Caretaker (Trafalgar Studios)
 Simon Russell Beale, London Assurance (National's Olivier) & Deathtrap (Noël Coward)
 Adrian Scarborough, After the Dance (National's Lyttelton)

Natasha Richardson Award for Best Actress
  Nancy Carroll, After the Dance (National's Lyttelton)
 Elena Roger, Passion (Donmar Warehouse)
 Sheridan Smith, Legally Blonde (Savoy)
 Sophie Thompson, Clybourne Park (Royal Court)

Longlisted
 Gemma Arterton, The Little Dog Laughed (Garrick)
 Judi Dench, A Midsummer Night's Dream (Rose, Kingston)
 Tamsin Greig, The Little Dog Laughed (Garrick)
 Jenny Jules, Ruined (Almeida)
 Keira Knightley, The Misanthrope (Comedy Theatre)
 Amanda Lawrence, Jiggery Pokery (BAC) & Henry VIII (Shakespeare's Globe)
 Rosaleen Linehan, The Beauty Queen of Leenane (Young Vic)
 Helen McCrory, The Late Middle Classes (Donmar Warehouse)
 Lesley Manville, Six Degrees of Separation (Old Vic)
 Anna Maxwell Martin, Measure for Measure (Almeida)
 Fiona Shaw, London Assurance (National's Olivier)
 Zoë Wanamaker, All My Sons (Apollo)

Ned Sherrin Award for Best Musical
  Passion, Donmar Warehouse
 Legally Blonde, Savoy Theatre
 Les Misérables (2010), a Cameron Mackintosh production at Barbican Theatre

Longlisted
 Hair, Gielgud Theatre
 The Human Comedy, a Young Vic/The Opera Group production co-produced with Watford Palace Theatre
 Sweet Charity, Menier Chocolate Factory, transferred to Theatre Royal Haymarket

Best Design
  Miriam Buether for Sucker Punch (Royal Court) & Earthquakes in London (National's Cottesloe)
 Bunny Christie for The White Guard (National's Lyttelton)
 Christopher Oram for Passion (Donmar Warehouse) & Red (Donmar Warehouse)

Longlisted
 Lez Brotherston for The Rise and Fall of Little Voice (Vaudeville) & Measure for Measure (Almeida) & Women Beware Women (National's Olivier) & Design for Living (Old Vic)
 Rob Howell for Private Lives (Vaudeville) & Deathtrap (Noël Coward)
 Vicki Mortimer for The Cat in the Hat (National's Cottesloe; transferred to Young Vic)
 Mark Thompson for London Assurance (National's Olivier)

Charles Wintour Award for Most Promising Playwright
  Anya Reiss for Spur of the Moment (Royal Court)
 DC Moore for The Empire (Royal Court)
 Nick Payne for If There Is I Haven't Found It Yet (Bush) & Wanderlust (Royal Court)

Longlisted
 James Graham for The Whisky Taster (Bush) & The Man (Finborough)
 Atiha Sen Gupta for What Fatima Did (Hampstead)
 Penelope Skinner for Eigengrau (Bush)

Milton Shulman Award for Outstanding Newcomer
  You Me Bum Bum Train created by Kate Bond and Morgan Lloyd (LEB Building, E2)
 Melanie C for her performance in Blood Brothers (Phoenix Theatre)
 Daniel Kaluuya for his performance in Sucker Punch (Royal Court)
 Isabella Laughland for her performance in Wanderlust (Royal Court)
 Shannon Tarbet for her performance in Spur of the Moment (Royal Court)

Longlisted
 Laura Dos Santos for her performance in Educating Rita (Menier Chocolate Factory, transferred to Trafalgar Studios)
 Simon Godwin for his direction of Wanderlust (Royal Court)
 Henry Lloyd-Hughes for his performances in Rope (Almeida) and Posh (Royal Court)
 James McArdle for his performance in Spur of the Moment (Royal Court)
 James Musgrave for his performance in Wanderlust (Royal Court)
 Nikesh Patel for his performance in Disconnect (Royal Court)

Editor's Award
  Daniel Kaluuya for his performance in Sucker Punch (Royal Court)

Lebedev Special Award
  Sir Michael Gambon for his contribution to theatre

Moscow Art Theatre's Golden Seagull
  Sir Peter Hall

Judges
 Sarah Sands, London Evening Standard
 Henry Hitchings, London Evening Standard
 Georgina Brown, Mail on Sunday
 Susannah Clapp, The Observer
 Charles Spencer, Daily Telegraph
 Matt Wolf, International Herald Tribune
 Evgeny Lebedev, London Evening Standard

References

Evening Standard Theatre Awards ceremonies
2010 theatre awards
2010 awards in the United Kingdom
November 2010 events in the United Kingdom